Kaupo is an Estonian-language male given name.

People named Kaupo include:
 Kaupo Kikkas, Estonian photographer
 Kaupo Palmar (born 1975), Estonian handball player

References

Estonian masculine given names